Długi Kąt may refer to the following places:
Długi Kąt, Lublin Voivodeship (east Poland)
Długi Kąt, Masovian Voivodeship (east-central Poland)
Długi Kąt, Silesian Voivodeship (south Poland)
Długi Kąt, Warmian-Masurian Voivodeship (north Poland)